Donald Eugene "Big Moose" Meyer (April 22, 1910 – November 10, 2000) was an American professional basketball player. He played for the Kankakee Gallagher Trojans in the National Basketball League for nine games during the 1938–39 season and averaged 3.3 points per game.

He is not related to teammate Little Moose Meyer, who happened to play alongside him with the Trojans.

References

1910 births
2000 deaths
American men's basketball players
Basketball players from Illinois
Centers (basketball)
Forwards (basketball)
Kankakee Gallagher Trojans players
People from Kankakee County, Illinois